Battistelli is an Italian surname. Notable people with the surname include:

Benoît Battistelli (born 1950), French diplomat
Francesca Battistelli (born 1985), American Christian pop singer
Giorgio Battistelli (born 1953), Italian composer
Mariam Battistelli, Italian operatic soprano
Stefano Battistelli (born 1970), Italian swimmer

Italian-language surnames